The 2021 DFB-Pokal Final decided the winner of the 2020–21 DFB-Pokal, the 78th season of the annual German football cup competition. The match was played on Thursday, 13 May 2021 (on the Feast of the Ascension, a German public holiday) at the Olympiastadion in Berlin. The match was originally scheduled for Saturday, 22 May 2021, but was moved to an earlier date prior to the completion of the league season in Germany. This was due to fixture density caused by the late start of the season, originating from the postponement of the end of the previous season as a result of the COVID-19 pandemic. As with other competitions, the match was played behind closed doors without any spectators.

The match featured RB Leipzig and Borussia Dortmund. Dortmund won the final 4–1 for their fifth DFB-Pokal title.

Due to the scheduling change, the match was the first DFB-Pokal final since 2008 to be played prior to the end of the league season, and the first final since 1985 to not be played on a Saturday. Additionally, it was the first final not played on a weekend since 1984, which was also the only prior final played on a Thursday.

As winners, Borussia Dortmund featured in the 2021 edition of the DFL-Supercup at the start of the following season, and facing the champion of the 2020–21 edition of the Bundesliga, Bayern Munich. The winner of the DFB-Pokal also earns automatic qualification for the group stage of the 2021–22 edition of the UEFA Europa League. However, as Dortmund already qualified for the 2021–22 edition of the UEFA Champions League through their position in the Bundesliga, the spot went to the team in sixth, and the league's UEFA Europa Conference League play-off round spot went to the team in seventh.

Teams
In the following table, finals until 1943 were in the Tschammerpokal era, since 1953 were in the DFB-Pokal era.

Background

Route to the final
The DFB-Pokal began with 64 teams in a single-elimination knockout cup competition. There were a total of five rounds leading up to the final. Teams were drawn against each other, and the winner after 90 minutes would advance. If still tied, 30 minutes of extra time was played. If the score was still level, a penalty shoot-out was used to determine the winner.

Note: In all results below, the score of the finalist is given first (H: home; A: away).

Match

Details

See also
2021 DFL-Supercup
Football in Berlin

Notes

References

External links
 
 Match report at kicker.de 
 Match report at WorldFootball.net
 Match report at Fussballdaten.de 

2021
2020–21 in German football cups
RB Leipzig matches
Borussia Dortmund matches
Football competitions in Berlin
May 2021 sports events in Germany
2021 in Berlin